The 1924–25 Sussex County Football League season was the fifth in the history of the competition.

League table
The league featured 13 clubs, 12 which competed in the last season, along with one new club:
 East Grinstead

League table

References

1924-25
9